Jaggie van Staden (born 14 January 1942) is a Rhodesian former boxer. He competed in the men's light welterweight event at the 1960 Summer Olympics. At the 1960 Summer Olympics, he defeated Gerald Freeman of Australia in the Round of 32, before losing to Sayed El-Nahas of the United Arab Republic in the Round of 16.

Van Staden also represented Rhodesia and Nyasaland at the 1962 British Empire and Commonwealth Games.

References

External links
 

1942 births
Living people
Rhodesian male boxers
Olympic boxers of Rhodesia
Boxers at the 1960 Summer Olympics
Commonwealth Games competitors for Rhodesia and Nyasaland
Boxers at the 1962 British Empire and Commonwealth Games
Afrikaner people
White Rhodesian people
Sportspeople from Bulawayo
Light-welterweight boxers